KDOC may refer to:

KDOC-TV, religious television station licensed to Anaheim, California
KDOC-FM, radio station licensed to Eyota, Minnesota
Kansas Department of Corrections